Rangers Football Club is a Scottish professional association football club based in Govan, Glasgow. They have played at their home ground, Ibrox, since 1899. Rangers were founding members of the Scottish Football League in 1890, and the Scottish Premier League in 1998.

Rangers have won 55 domestic top-flight league trophies. The club's record appearance maker is John Greig, who made 755 appearances between 1961 and 1978 in all matches. Ally McCoist is the club's record goalscorer, scoring 355 goals during his Rangers career.

This list encompasses the major honours won by Rangers as well as records set by the club, their managers and their players. The player records section includes details of the club's leading goalscorers and those who had made most appearances in first-team competitions. It also records notable achievements by Rangers players on the international stage, and the highest transfer fees paid and received by the club. Attendance records at Ibrox are also included in the list.

Honours

Rangers have won honours both domestically and in European cup competitions. They have won the Scottish League Championship a record 55 times and the Scottish League Cup a record 27 times. In their first league season, 1890–91, they won the Scottish Football league jointly with Dumbarton and their most recent success came in the 2020–21 Scottish Premiership.

Rangers were the first club in the world to win 50 first tier league titles, and have now won 55 domestic league titles. Rangers have also won seven domestic trebles, a joint world record. They won their 100th major trophy in 2000, the first club in the world to reach that milestone. They are the second most-honoured football club in the world, having won 116 trophies in total.
The club has played in both Scotland and England's national cup competitions. Rangers reached the semi-final of the 1886–87 FA Cup only to be knocked out by eventual winners Aston Villa.

Domestic

League

Scottish League Championship (first tier league title):
Winners (55): 1891, 1899, 1900, 1901, 1902, 1911, 1912, 1913, 1918, 1920, 1921, 1923, 1924, 1925, 1927, 1928, 1929, 1930, 1931, 1933, 1934, 1935, 1937, 1939, 1947, 1949, 1950, 1953, 1956, 1957, 1959, 1961, 1963, 1964, 1975, 1976, 1978, 1987, 1989, 1990, 1991, 1992, 1993, 1994, 1995, 1996, 1997, 1999, 2000, 2003, 2005, 2009, 2010, 2011 2021
Runners-up (33): 1893, 1896, 1898, 1905, 1914, 1916, 1919, 1922, 1932, 1936, 1948, 1951, 1952, 1953, 1958, 1962, 1966, 1967, 1968, 1969, 1970, 1973, 1977, 1979, 1998, 2001, 2002, 2004, 2007, 2008, 2012, 2019, 2020, 2022
Scottish Championship (second-tier league title)
Winners: 2016
Scottish League One (third tier league title)
Winners: 2014
Scottish Third Division (fourth tier league title)
Winners: 2013

Cups

Scottish Cup:
Winners (34): 1894, 1897, 1898, 1903, 1928, 1930, 1932, 1934, 1935, 1936, 1948, 1949, 1950, 1953, 1960, 1962, 1963, 1964, 1966, 1973, 1976, 1978, 1979, 1981, 1992, 1993, 1996, 1999, 2000, 2002, 2003, 2008, 2009 2022
Runners-up (18): 1877, 1879, 1899, 1904, 1905, 1921, 1922, 1929, 1969, 1971, 1977, 1980, 1982, 1983, 1989, 1994, 1998, 2016
Scottish League Cup:
Winners (27): 1947, 1949, 1961, 1962, 1964, 1965, 1971, 1976, 1978, 1979, 1982, 1984, 1985, 1987, 1988, 1988–89, 1990–91, 1992–93, 1993–94, 1996–97, 1998–99, 2001–02, 2002–03, 2004–05, 2007–08, 2009–10, 2010–11
Runners-up (9): 1952, 1958, 1966, 1967, 1983, 1990, 2009, 2019, 2023

International

UEFA Cup Winners' Cup
Winners: 1972
Runners-up: 1961, 1967

UEFA Cup/UEFA Europa League
Runners-up: 2008, 2022

UEFA Super Cup
Runners-up: 1972

Others

League
Emergency War League
Winners: 1939–40
Southern League
Winners (6): 1941, 1942, 1943, 1944, 1945, 1946
Glasgow League
Winners: 1895–96, 1897–98

Cups
Emergency War Cup
Winners: 1940
Southern League Cup
Winners (4): 1941, 1942, 1943,1945
Runners-up: 1944, 1946
Victory Cup
Winners: 1946
Summer Cup
Winners: 1942
Glasgow Cup
Winners (44): 1893, 1894, 1897, 1898, 1900, 1901, 1902, 1911, 1912, 1913, 1914, 1918, 1919, 1922, 1923, 1924, 1925, 1930, 1932, 1933, 1934, 1936, 1937, 1938, 1940, 1942, 1943, 1944, 1945, 1948, 1950, 1954, 1957, 1958, 1960, 1969, 1971, 1975, 1976, 1979, 1983, 1985, 1986, 1987
Glasgow Merchants Charity Cup
Winners (32): 1878–79, 1896–97, 1899–1900, 1903–04, 1905–06, 1906–07, 1908–09, 1910–11, 1918–19, 1921–22, 1922–23, 1924–25, 1927–28, 1928–29, 1929–30, 1930–31, 1931–32, 1932–33, 1933–34, 1938–39, 1939–40, 1940–41, 1941–42, 1943–44, 1944–45, 1945–46, 1946–47, 1947–48, 1950–51, 1954–55, 1956–57, 1959–60
Scottish Challenge Cup
Winners: 2015–16
Runners-up: 2013–14

Minor honours

Queen's Park Tournament: 1886
Sir William Cunningham Cup: 1889
Rangers Sports Trophy: 1890
Port Glasgow Athletic Tournament: 1892
Football World Championship: 1894, 1900
Glasgow International Exhibition Cup: 1901
Edinburgh Exhibition Cup: 1908
Lord Provost's Cup: 1921
British Champions' Challenge: 1933
Sir Archibald Sinclair Cup: 1942
Paisley Charity Cup: 1972
Jet Cup: 1977
Tennent Caledonian Cup: 1978

Drybrough Cup: 1979
Dubai Champions Cup: 1987
Forum Cup: 1991
Ibrox International Challenge Trophy: 1995
Wernesgrüner Cup: 2004 2003
Walter Tull Memorial Cup: 
Blackthorn Cup: 2013
Veolia Trophy: 2020

Player records

Appearances
John Greig holds Rangers' appearance record, having played 755 times over the course of 18 seasons from 1961 to 1978. He also holds the records for League Cup appearances, with 121 appearances. Sandy Archibald is the holder of the most league appearances, having made 513, from 1917 to 1934. The Scottish Cup appearance record holder is midfielder Alec Smith while goalkeeper Allan McGregor holds the record for the most European appearances.

Most appearances in all competitions: John Greig, 755
Most league appearances: Sandy Archibald, 513
Most Scottish Cup appearances: Alec Smith, 74
Most League Cup appearances: John Greig, 121
Most European appearances: Allan McGregor, 109
Most Challenge Cup appearances: Lee Wallace, 14
Youngest first-team player: Derek Ferguson,  (vs. Queen of the South, 24 August 1983)
Oldest first-team player: David Weir,  (vs. Malmö FF, 26 July 2011)
Oldest debutant: Gareth McAuley,  (vs. Spartak Moscow, 8 November 2018)
Most consecutive appearances: William Robb, 241 (from 13 April 1920 until 31 October 1925)
Most appearances in a season: Carlos Cuéllar, 65 (during the 2007–08 season)
Longest-serving player: Dougie Gray, 22 years (from 27 July 1925 until April 1947)

Most appearances
Competitive, professional matches only. Matches in parentheses are all time records.

Goalscorers

Rangers' all-time leading scorer is Ally McCoist, who scored 355 goals in a fifteen-year spell at the club from 1983 to 1998. He holds the record for the most goals in the Scottish League Cup competition with 54. However, McCoist was unable to surpass the Scottish Cup goal-scoring record of Jimmy Fleming, which has stood at 44 since 1934. Jim Forrest holds the record for the most goals in one season with 57 in all competitions.

Most goals in all competitions: Ally McCoist, 355
Most league goals: Ally McCoist, 251
Most Scottish Cup goals: Jimmy Fleming, 44
Most League Cup goals: Ally McCoist, 54
Most Challenge Cup goals: Kenny Miller / Lee McCulloch, 5
Most European goals: Alfredo Morelos, 29
Most goals in one season: Jim Forrest, 57 (during the 1964–65 season)
Most league goals in one season: Sam English, 44 (during the 1931–32 season)
Most hat-tricks: Ally McCoist, 28
Most penalties scored: Johnny Hubbard, 54
Most consecutive games scored in: Alfredo Morelos, 7 (during the 2018–19 season)
Most goals scored by player in a match:
League match:
Jimmy Smith, 6 goals, won 9–1, (vs. Ayr United, 15 August 1933)
Jimmy Smith, 6 goals, won 7–1 (vs. Dunfermline Athletic, 11 August 1934)
Davie Wilson, 6 goals, won 7–1 (vs. Falkirk, 17 March 1962)
Scottish Cup match: Jimmy Fleming, 9 goals (vs. Blairgowrie, 20 January 1934)
Scottish League Cup match: Jim Forrest, 5 goals (vs. Hamilton Academical, 30 October 1965)
European match: Dave McPherson, 4 goals (vs. Valletta, 14 September 1983)
Youngest goalscorer: Willie Thornton,  (vs. Arbroath, 9 January 1937)
Oldest goalscorer: David Weir,  (vs. Kilmarnock, 9 November 2008)
Fastest goal scored in a match: Gordon Durie, 11 seconds (vs. Dundee United, 1 April 1995)

Top goalscorers

Internationalists

First capped player: Moses McNeil (for Scotland, against Wales, 25 March 1876).
Most international caps while a Rangers player: Steven Davis, 61 for Northern Ireland
Most capped player to play for Rangers: Steven Davis, 140
Most capped Scottish player to play for Rangers: David Weir and Kenny Miller, 69
Player with most overall international goals to play for Rangers: David Healy, 36 for Northern Ireland
Most international goals while a Rangers player: Ally McCoist, 19 for Scotland
First Rangers player to appear at a World Cup: Eric Caldow (for Scotland vs. Yugoslavia, 8 June 1958)
First Rangers player to score at a World Cup: Sammy Baird (for Scotland vs. France, 15 June 1958)
FIFA World Cup
Most appearances while a Rangers player: Sandy Jardine, 4
Most goals while a Rangers player: Sammy Baird / Mo Johnston, 1
First winner to play for Rangers: Lionel Charbonnier (France)
UEFA European Championship
Most European Championship appearances while a Rangers player: Andy Goram and Stuart McCall, 6
Most European Championship goals while a Rangers player: Brian Laudrup, 3
First Rangers player to appear: Chris Woods (for England, vs. Soviet Union, 18 June 1988)
First Rangers player to score: Brian Laudrup (for Denmark, vs. Portugal, 9 June 1996)
First winner to play for Rangers: Brian Laudrup (Denmark)

Transfers
For consistency, fees in the record transfer tables below are all sourced from BBC Sport's contemporary reports of each transfer. Where the report mentions an initial fee potentially rising to a higher figure depending on contractual clauses being satisfied in the future, only the initial fee is listed in the tables.

Record transfer fees paid

Record transfer fees received

Managerial records 

First manager: William Wilton, from 27 May 1899 to 20 May 1920
Longest-serving manager by time: Bill Struth, from 20 May 1920 to 15 June 1954
Shortest-serving manager by time: Pedro Caixinha, from 13 March 2017 to 26 October 2017
First non-Scottish manager: Dick Advocaat, from 1 June 1998 to 12 December 2001

Club records

Matches

Firsts
First match: vs. Callander, Friendly, Draw 0–0, Flesher's Haugh (Glasgow Green), (H) May 1872
First Scottish Cup match: vs. Oxford University A.F.C., Won 2–0, Recreational Ground – Queen's Park, Glasgow, 12 October 1874
First FA Cup match: vs. Everton, Won 1–0, Stanley Park (A), 30 October 1886
First League match: vs. Heart of Midlothian, Won 5–2, Ibrox Park (H), 16 August 1890
First match at 'first' Ibrox: vs. Preston North End, Friendly, Lost 8–1, (H) 20 August 1887
First match at 'second' Ibrox: vs. Heart of Midlothian, Won 3–1, Inter-City League, (H) 30 December 1899
First League Cup match: vs. St Mirren, Won 4–0, Ibrox Park (H), 21 September 1946
First European match: vs. Nice, Won 2–1, European Cup, Ibrox Park (H), 24 October 1956
First Challenge Cup match: vs. Brechin City, Won 2–1, Glebe Park (H), 29 July 2012

Wins
 Record victory
Record win: 
14-2 (against Whitehill, 29 September 1883)
14–2 (vs. Blairgowrie, 20 January 1934).
Record league win: 10–0 (vs. Hibernian, 24 December 1898)
Record Scottish Cup win:
13–0 (vs. Possilpark, 6 October 1877)
13–0 (vs. Uddingston, 10 November 1877)
13–0 (vs. Kelvinside Athletic, 28 September 1889)
Record League Cup win: 9–1 (vs. St Johnstone, 15 August 1964)
Record European win: 10–0 (vs. Valletta, 28 September 1983)
Most league wins in a season: 18 wins out of 18 games (during the 1898–99 season)
Fewest league wins in a season: 8 wins out of 18 games (during the 1893–94 season)

Defeats
Record defeat:
 2–10 (vs. Airdrieonians, Friendly, 6 February 1886)
 0–8 Vale of Leven (Friendly, 6 November 1888}

Record league defeat: 0–6 (vs. Dumbarton, 4 May 1892)
Record Scottish Cup defeat: 0–6 (vs. Aberdeen, 10 April 1954)
Record League Cup defeat: 1–7 (vs. Celtic, 19 October 1957)
Record European defeat:
 0–6 (vs. Real Madrid, 9 October 1963)
 1–7 (vs. Liverpool, 12 October 2022)
Most league defeats in a season: 14 defeats from 36 games (during the 1979–80 and the 1985–86 seasons)
Fewest defeats in a season: 0 defeats from 18 games (during the 1898–99 season) and 0 defeats from 36 games (during the 2013-14 season) 0 defeats from 38 games 2020–21 season

Goals
Most league goals scored in a season: 118 goals in 38 games (during the 1933–34 season)
Fewest league goals scored in a season: 
 From 18 league matches: 41 goals
 From 20 league matches: 60 goals
 From 22 league matches: 56 goals
 From 26 league matches: 80 goals 
 From 30 league matches: 56 goals
 From 34 league matches: 58 goals
 From 36 league matches: 48 goals
 From 38 league matches: 56 goals (during the 2016–17 season)
 From 42 league matches: 83 goals
 From 44 league matches: 74 goals
Most league goals conceded in a season: 55 goals (twice, during the 1925–26 and 1938–39 seasons)
Fewest league goals conceded in a season: 13 goals (during the 2020–21 season)
1,000th league goal: Alex Smith, (against Clyde, won 5–1, 8 December 1906).
2,000th league goal: Jimmy Gordon, (against Kilmarnock, won 7–1, 15 September 1919).
3,000th league goal: Bob McGowan, (against Cowdenbeath, won 7–0, 20 December 1930).
4,000th league goal: Jimmy Duncanson, (against Dundee, won 3–1, 25 December 1947).
5,000th league goal: Alex Scott, (against Ayr United, won 7-3, 29 April 1961).
6,000th league goal: Derek Parlane, (against Heart of Midlothian, won 4-2, 19 January 1974).
7,000th league goal: Ally McCoist, (against Motherwell, won 3–0, 9 December 1989).
8,000th league goal: Shota Arveladze, (against Dundee, won 3–0, 10 August 2002). 
9,000th league goal: Lee McCulloch, (against Raith Rovers, won 6-1, 18 October 2014).

Points
Most points in a season:
Two points for a win: 76 (during the 1920–21 season)
Three points for a win: 102 (during the 2020–21 season)

Fewest points in a season:
Two points for a win: 20 (during the 1893–94 season)
Three points for a win: 67 (during the 2016–17 season)

Attendances
Record Scottish League attendance: 118,567 (vs. Celtic, won 2–1, Ibrox Park (H), 2 January 1939)
Record Scottish Cup attendance: 143,570 (vs. Hibernian, won 1–0, Hampden Park (N), 27 March 1948)
Record Scottish League Cup attendance: 125,154 (vs. Hibernian, won 3–1, Hampden Park (N), 22 March 1947)
Record European attendance: 100,000 (vs. Dynamo Kiev, lost 1–0, Respublikanskiy Stadium (A), 16 September 1987)
Record home League attendance: 118,567 (vs. Celtic, won 2–1, 2 January 1939)
Record home Scottish Cup attendance: 102,342 (vs. Hibernian, lost 3–2, 10 February 1951)
Record home Scottish League Cup attendance: 105,000  (vs. Celtic, won 2–1, 16 October 1948)
Record home European attendance: 85,000 (vs. Leeds United, draw 0–0, 26 March 1968)
Lowest home League attendance: 2,000 (vs. Partick Thistle, won 1–0, 23 May 1979)
Lowest home Scottish Cup attendance:
Lowest home Scottish League Cup attendance: 5,000 (vs. Brechin City, won 1–0, 23 September 1981)
Lowest home European attendance: 14,268 (vs. ASK Vorwärts Berlin, won 2–1, 15 November 1961)

European statistics

Notes

References

External links
 Rangers official website – Honours
 Rangers Official website – Records and Honours

Rangers
Records and Statistics
Records